The 1999 European Parliament election for the election of the delegation from the Netherlands was held on 10 June 1999.
This is the 5th time the elections have been held for the European elections in the Netherlands.

Sources for everything below:

Numbering of the candidates list 
The official order and names of candidate lists: 

| colspan="6" | 
|-
! style="background-color:#E9E9E9;text-align:center;vertical-align:top;" colspan=5 | Lists
|-
!style="background-color:#E9E9E9;text-align:center;" colspan="3"|List
!style="background-color:#E9E9E9;| English translation
!style="background-color:#E9E9E9;| List name (Dutch)
|-
| 1
| 
| style="text-align:left;" | list
| style="text-align:left;" | CDA - European People's Party
| style="text-align:left;" | CDA – Europese Volkspartij

|-
| 2
| 
| style="text-align:left;" | list
| style="text-align:left;" | P.v.d.A./European Social Democrats
| style="text-align:left;" | P.v.d.A./Europese Sociaaldemocraten

|-
| 3
| 
| style="text-align:left;" | list
| style="text-align:left;" | VVD - European Liberal-Democrats
| style="text-align:left;" | VVD – Europese Liberaal-Democraten

|-
| 4
| 
| style="text-align:left;" | list
| style="text-align:left;" colspan="2" | D66

|-
| 5
| 
| style="text-align:left;" | list
| style="text-align:left;" | SGP, GPV and RPF
| style="text-align:left;" | SGP, GPV en RPF

|-
| 6
| 
| style="text-align:left;" | list
| style="text-align:left;" | GREENLEFT
| style="text-align:left;" | GROENLINKS

|-
| 7
| 
| style="text-align:left;" | list
| style="text-align:left;" | CD/Conservative Democrats
| style="text-align:left;" | CD/Conservatieve Democraten

|-
| 8
| 
| style="text-align:left;" | list
| style="text-align:left;" | List Sala
| style="text-align:left;" | Lijst Sala

|-
| 9
| 
| style="text-align:left;" | list
| style="text-align:left;" | European Electorate Platform Netherlands
| style="text-align:left;" | Europees Verkiezers Platform Nederland

|-
| 10
| 
| style="text-align:left;" | list
| style="text-align:left;" | SP (Socialist Party)
| style="text-align:left;" | SP (Socialistische Partij)

|-
| 11
| 
| style="text-align:left;" | list
| style="text-align:left;" | THE EUROPEAN PARTY
| style="text-align:left;" | DE EUROPESE PARTIJ

|-
|}

Candidate lists

CDA - European People's Party 

Below is the candidate list for the Christian Democratic Appeal for the 1999 European Parliament election

Elected members are in bold

P.v.d.A./European Social Democrats 

Below is the candidate list for the Labour Party for the 1999 European Parliament election

Elected members are in bold

VVD - European Liberal-Democrats 

Below is the candidate list for the People's Party for Freedom and Democracy for the 1999 European Parliament election

Elected members are in bold

D66 

Below is the candidate list for the Democrats 66 for the 1999 European Parliament election

Elected members are in bold

SGP, GPV and RPF 

Below is the candidate list for SGP, GPV and RPF for the 1999 European Parliament election

Elected members are in bold

GreenLeft 

Below is the candidate list for GreenLeft for the 1999 European Parliament election

Elected members are in bold

CD/Conservative Democrats 

Below is the candidate list for the Centre Democrat for the 1999 European Parliament election

List Sala 
Below is the candidate list for the List Sala for the 1999 European Parliament election

European Electorate Platform Netherlands 
Below is the candidate list for the European Electorate Platform Netherlands for the 1999 European Parliament election

SP (Socialist Party) 

Below is the candidate list for Socialist Party for the 1999 European Parliament election

Elected members are in bold

The European Party 
Below is the candidate list for The European Party for the 1999 European Parliament election

References

1999
Netherlands